Makrino is a village and a community of the Zagori municipality. Before the 2011 local government reform it was part of the municipality of East Zagori, of which it was a municipal district. The 2011 census recorded 36 inhabitants in the village. The community of Makrino covers an area of 20.147 km2. Makrino is a traditional Aromanian-speaking settlement.

See also
List of settlements in the Ioannina regional unit

References

Populated places in Ioannina (regional unit)